Vladimir may refer to:

Names
 Vladimir (name) for the Bulgarian, Croatian, Czech, Macedonian, Romanian, Russian, Serbian, Slovak and Slovenian spellings of a Slavic name
 Uladzimir for the Belarusian version of the name
 Volodymyr for the Ukrainian version of the name
 Włodzimierz (given name) for the Polish version of the name
 Valdemar for the Germanic version of the name
 Wladimir for an alternative spelling of the name

Places
 Vladimir, Russia, a city in Russia
 Vladimir Oblast, a federal subject of Russia
 Vladimir-Suzdal, a medieval principality
 Vladimir, Ulcinj, a village in Ulcinj Municipality, Montenegro
 Vladimir, Gorj, a commune in Gorj County, Romania
 Vladimir, a village in Goiești Commune, Dolj County, Romania
 Vladimir (river), a tributary of the Gilort in Gorj County, Romania
 Volodymyr (city), a city in Ukraine

Religious leaders
 Metropolitan Vladimir (disambiguation), multiple
 Jovan Vladimir (d. 1016), ruler of Doclea and a saint of the Serbian Orthodox Church

Musicians
 Vladimir Horowitz (1903–1989), a Russian American legendary classical virtuoso pianist and minor composer
 Vladimir Ashkenazy (1937–), a Russian-Icelandic renowned classical pianist and conductor

Nobles
 Vladimir of Bulgaria (fl. 889–893), King of Bulgaria
 Vladimir I of Kiev (980–1015), medieval ruler of Kievan Rus
 Vladimir II Monomakh (1053–1125), Veliky Knyaz of Kievan Rus, prince of Kiev;  also ruled in Rostov and Suzdal
 Vladimir II Mstislavich (1132–1173), Prince of Dorogobuzh, Vladimir, and Volyn, Slutsk, Tripolye and Grand Prince of Kiev
 Vladimir of Novgorod (1020–1052), Prince of Novgorod
 Vladimir III Rurikovich (1187–1239), Prince of Pereyaslavl, Smolensk and Grand Prince of Kiev
 Vladimir of Staritsa (1533–1569), Appanage Prince of Russia, cousin to Tsar Ivan the Terrible

Political and military leaders
 Vladimir the Bold (1353–1410), commander of the Muscovite armies in the 14th century
 Vladimir Lenin (1870–1924), pseudonym of Vladimir Ilyich Ulyanov, leader of the Bolshevik Revolution and first leader of the Soviet Union
 Vladimir Putin (b. 1952), current President of the Russian Federation

Athletes
 Vladimir González (b. 1978), a Colombian road cyclist
 Vladimir Guerrero (b. 1976), a baseball player
 Vladimir Latocha (b. 1973), a French breaststroke swimmer
 Vladimir Núñez (b. 1975), a Cuban Major League Baseball relief pitcher 
 Vladimir Timoshinin (b. 1970), a Russian diver
 Vladimir Parfyonov (b. 1970), an Uzbekistani javelin thrower
 Vladimir Popov (weightlifter) (b. 1977), a Moldovan weightlifter
 Vladimir Portnoi (b. 1931), a Soviet Olympic silver and bronze medalist in gymnastics
 Vladimir Orlando Cardoso de Araújo Filho (b. 1989), a Brazilian footballer
 Oleg Prudius (a.k.a. Vladimir Kozlov) (b. 1972), a Ukrainian professional wrestler
 Vladimir Vujovic (b. 1982), a Montenegrin footballer who played for Bhayangkara F.C.

Fictional characters
 Vladimir (Waiting for Godot), also known as Vladimir "Albert" and "Didi", a character in Samuel Beckett's Waiting for Godot
 Vovochka, diminutive form of Vladimir, common character in Russian jokes
 Vladimir, a character from My Life as a Teenage Robot
 Vladimir "Uncle Vlad" Glebov, character from GTA IV
 Vladimir Makarov, character from Call of Duty
 Vladimir DeMordrey, character from Sacred
 Baron Vladimir Harkonnen, character from Dune

Actors, writers, poets
 Vladimir Semyonovich Vysotsky (1938–1980), an actor, poet, bard, and writer
 Vladimir Vladimirovich Nabokov (1899–1977), a multilingual Russian novelist
 Vladimir Oravsky (b. 1947), a multilingual Slovak novelist

Artists
 Vladimír Havlík (b. 1959), a Czech action artist
 Vladimir Kush (b. 1965), a Russian born surrealist painter and sculptor

Ships
  Imperial Russian Navy ship

See also
 Vlad
 Vladimirov
 Vladimirovka (disambiguation)
 Vladimirsky (disambiguation)
 Vladimirovsky
 Hvaldimir, a beluga whale found in Norway
 Vlademir (born 1979), Brazilian footballer